The Sarasota Gulls were a minor league baseball team, based in Sarasota, Florida, as a member of the early Florida State League. The team played in 1926 as the Gulls, however the following season they played as the Sarasota Tarpons. They were the first team to represent Sarasota inside of Florida State League. The city would not host another FSL team until the Sarasota Sun Sox arrived in 1961. The team folded in 1928, when the FSL went on a hiatus.

Notable players
Jumbo Brown
Ivy Olson

References
Baseball Reference

Baseball teams established in 1926
Defunct Florida State League teams
Sports in Sarasota County, Florida
Defunct baseball teams in Florida
Baseball teams disestablished in 1928
1926 establishments in Florida
1928 disestablishments in Florida